The 2007 Critérium du Dauphiné Libéré was the 59th edition of the Critérium du Dauphiné Libéré cycle race and was held from 10 June to 17 June 2007.

Teams
Nineteen teams, each with a maximum of eight riders, entered the race:

Pre-race favourites
The race was important preparation for the Tour de France. Of top names, defending champion Levi Leipheimer, Alejandro Valverde, Óscar Pereiro, Denis Menchov and Alexander Vinokourov were in the race while Thor Hushovd and Tom Boonen head the sprinters' group.

Route

Stages 
The first, second and third placed riders, of each stage, were given 3, 2 and 1 UCI ProTour points, respectively.

Prologue
10 June 2008 - Grenoble,  (ITT)

Stage 1
11 June 2008 - Grenoble to Roanne,

Stage 2
12 June 2008 - Saint-Paul-en-Jarez to Saint-Étienne,

Stage 3
13 June 2008 - Anneyron,  (ITT)

Stage 4
14 June 2008 - Hauterives to Le Mont-Ventoux,

Stage 5
15 June 2008 - Nyons to Digne-les-Bains,

Stage 6
16 June 2008 - Gap to Valloire,

Stage 7
17 June 2008 - Valloire to Annecy,

General Classification

Jersey progress

References

Further reading

External links 

 

2007
2007 UCI ProTour
2007 in French sport
June 2007 sports events in France